Šeškinė (literally ) is a fairly new district located in the north of Vilnius, the capital of Lithuania, built in 1977 as a microdistrict.

Šeškinė is a largely residential district although it is also home to the Akropolis Mall, one of the largest in Eastern Europe. The second largest sports facilities in Lithuania, the Siemens Arena and the Lietuvos Rytas Arena, are also located there. The only water park in Vilnius was opened on June 1, 2007 next to the Siemens Arena.

Earlier, the village of Šeškinė was located there, from which the neighborhood derives its name.

History
In historical sources, Šeškinė has been mentioned in 1390 and 1545. From 12th till mid-19th centuries, the current territory of Šeškinė belonged to Radziwiłł family. Until then, it was but a small settlement with wooden houses. In 1955, Šeškinė was incorporated to Vilnius city municipality and became a neighborhood. In 1977, Šeškinė neighborhood started to build multi-storey apartment blocks.

References

 
Neighbourhoods of Vilnius